Trilochan Kanungo is an Indian politician. He was elected to the Lok Sabha, the lower house of the Parliament of India as a member of the Biju Janata Dal.

References

External links
 Official biographical sketch in Parliament of India website

1940 births
Living people
Lok Sabha members from Odisha
India MPs 1999–2004
Biju Janata Dal politicians
Janata Dal politicians
Indian National Congress politicians from Odisha